A special Kentucky Route (neologistically a bannered Kentucky Route) is a special route of the system of the system of state highways in the Commonwealth of Kentucky.

Like the special U.S. routes, special state routes, as the name suggests, are typically marked with an auxiliary sign (or "banner") above (or occasionally below) the route shield, or a suffix letter after the number in the shield. In some cases, the name of the special route type was to be placed on the shield itself, most notably in the case of Kentucky Route 11 Business (KY 11 Bus.) and KY 32 Bus. in Flemingsburg, in Fleming County.

The list below includes the route numbers and locations which the special routes are located.

KY 1–KY 100

KY 3
KY 3 Spur: Louisa, Lawrence County

KY 8
KY 8 Conn.: Lewis County
KY 8 Spur: South Portsmouth, Greenup County

KY 11
KY 11 Bus.: Flemingsburg, Fleming County

KY 15
KY 15 Spur -- Campton, Wolfe County
KY 15 Bus.: Hazard, Perry County
KY 15 Conn.: Whitesburg, Letcher County
KY 15 Bus.: Whitesburg, Letcher County

KY 17
KY 17 Bus.: Independence, Kenton County

KY 22
KY 22 Conn.: Metro Louisville/Jefferson County
KY 22 Bus.: Williamstown, Grant County

KY 32
KY 32 Bus.: Flemingsburg, Fleming County
KY 32 Conn.: Louisa, Lawrence County

KY 55
KY 55 Bus.: Columbia, Adair County
KY 55 Spur: Lebanon, Marion County
KY 55 Bus.: Shelbyville, Shelby County

KY 57
KY 57 Bus.: Flemingsburg, Fleming County

KY 61
KY 61 Conn.: Metro Louisville, Jefferson County
Also known as Harrison Street, connects KY 61 north with KY 61 south as KY 61 is split in this area.

KY 70
KY 70 Byp.: Cave City, Barren County
KY 70 Bus.: Liberty, Casey County

KY 74
KY 74 Truck: Middlesboro, Bell County

KY 79
KY 79 Truck: Morgantown, Butler County

KY 80
KY 80 Bus.: Mayfield, Graves County
KY 80 CONN: Somerset, Pulaski County
KY 80 Bus.: Somerset, Pulaski County 
KY 80 Spur: Martin, Floyd County

KY 90
KY 90 Alt.: Glasgow, Barren County
KY 90 Truck: Glasgow, Barren County
KY 90 Bus.: Monticello, Wayne County
KY 90 Spur: Cumberland Falls, Whitley County

KY 94
KY 94 Conn.: Fulton County (connects KY 94 with US 51)
KY 94 Conn.: Calloway County (connects KY 94 with KY 80)
KY 94 Spur: Calloway County

KY 100
KY 100 Truck: Franklin, Simpson County

KY 101–KY 200

KY 121
KY 121 Bus.: Mayfield, Graves County

KY 189
KY 189 Conn.: Powderly, Muhlenberg County

KY 194
KY 194 Conn.: Freeburn, Pike County
KY 194 Spur: Freeburn, Pike County

KY 201–KY 1000

KY 329
KY 329 BYP: Crestwood, Oldham County

KY 439 
KY 439 Conn.: Columbia, Adair County

KY 451 
KY 451 Conn.: Hazard, Perry County

KY 480 
KY 480 CONN: Shepherdsville, Bullitt County

KY 627 
KY 627 Truck: Winchester, Clark County

KY 913 
KY 913 Conn.: Metro Louisville/Jefferson County

KY 1001–KY 6999

KY 2034
KY 2034 Conn.: Ermine, Letcher County

KY 2107
KY 2107 Conn.: Cleaton, Muhlenberg County

KY 2295
KY 2295 Conn.: Somerset, Pulaski County

KY 2491
KY 2491 Conn.: Wolfe County

See also 
List of state highways in Kentucky (1-999)
List of state highways in Kentucky (1000-1999)
List of state highways in Kentucky (2000-2999)

References

External links 
Kentucky Transportation Cabinet Division of Planning

Bannered
Bannered